The orders, decorations, and medals of the Austrian states, in which each states of Austria has devised a system of orders and awards to honour residents for actions or deeds that benefit their local community or state, are in turn subsumed within the Austrian honours system. Each state sets their own rules and criteria on eligibility and also how each medal is awarded and presented. Most of the orders allow for the recipient to wear their orders in public.

State orders

See also 
 Orders, decorations, and medals of Austria

References 

Orders, decorations, and medals of Austria